The Bancuro Church Ruins, or locally known as Simbahang Bato (Stone Church), is a Roman Catholic church located in Barangay Bancuro, Naujan, Oriental Mindoro, Philippines. It earned the moniker "a church within a church" because a small chapel is currently housed within the ruins' massive walls.

History
The Simbahang Bato was built during the 1680s-1690s when the Augustinians established their first settlement in Bancuro, Naujan. Its thick walls were made of coraline stones and bonded by lime mortar. The Simbahang Bato was originally built as a convent and became a parish.
In 1842 the "Asultos de Moro", the great raid in the Island of Mindoro, destroyed the first settlement in Bancuro by Moro invaders and because of this, the church served not only as a house of worship but also as a fort and refuge for the locals. In 1858, the capital of Naujan was transferred from Bancuro to "Bulwagan" Naujan. It was then became a pastoral community of San Nicolas de Tolentino Parish under the supervision of the Society of the Divine Word in 1937. In 2006, the San Agustin Chaplaincy took over the pastoral work of the Simbahang Bato.

Archaeology
In 2004, the University of the Philippines Archaeological Studies Program excavated in the church ruins with the goal of investigating the main settlement of Naujan, as mentioned in old written documents. Initially seen as a suspicious activity in the light of the looming 2004 national and local elections, the excavation contributed to the tourism sector later on when the municipal and provincial governments included the Bancuro Church Ruins in their list of tourist attractions.

Image Gallery

References

External links
Bancuro Church Ruins

Roman Catholic churches in Oriental Mindoro